Mount Kenney is a sharp summit,  high, in the Cathedral Peaks, rising  east of Shackleton Glacier and  northwest of Mount Wade, in the Prince Olav Mountains of Antarctica. It was discovered and photographed by U.S. Navy Operation Highjump, 1946–47, and was named by the Advisory Committee on Antarctic Names for Lieutenant Leroy S. Kenney of the United States Marine Corps Reserve, a helicopter and airplane pilot with U.S. Navy Squadron VX-6 during Operation Deep Freeze.

References

Mountains of the Ross Dependency
Dufek Coast